The 1935 Furman Purple Hurricane football team represented Furman University as a member of the Southern Intercollegiate Athletic Association (SIAA) during the 1935 college football season. Led by fourth-year head coach Dizzy McLeod, the Purple Hurricane compiled an overall record of 8–1, with a mark of 4–0 in conference play, and finished third in the SIAA.

Schedule

References

Furman
Furman Paladins football seasons
Furman Purple Hurricane football